Electron transfer flavoprotein-ubiquinone oxidoreductase, mitochondrial is an enzyme that in humans is encoded by the ETFDH gene. This gene encodes a component of the electron-transfer system in mitochondria and is essential for electron transfer from a number of mitochondrial flavin-containing dehydrogenases to the main respiratory chain.

Function 

Electron-transferring-flavoprotein dehydrogenase in the inner mitochondrial membrane accepts electrons from electron-transfer flavoprotein which is located in the mitochondrial matrix and reduces ubiquinone in the mitochondrial membrane. Deficiency in electron-transferring-flavoprotein dehydrogenase have been demonstrated in some patients with type II glutaric aciduria.

Structure 
The ETFDH gene is located on the q arm of chromosome 4 in position 32.1 and has 13 exons spanning 36,613 base pairs. The protein is synthesized as a 67-kDa precursor which is targeted to mitochondria and processed in a single step to a 64-kDa mature form located in the mitochondrial membrane. This 64-kDA mature form is a monomer integrated into the mitochondrial inner membrane, containing a 4Fe-4S cluster and 1 molecule of FAD.

Function 
This enzyme, along with electron transfer flavoprotein (ETF), is required for electron transfer from more than 9 mitochondrial flavin-containing dehydrogenases to the main respiratory chains. It accepts electrons from ETF and reduces ubiquinone.

Clinical Significance 
Mutations in the ETFDH can cause glutaric aciduria 2C (GA2C), an autosomal recessively inherited disorder of fatty acid, amino acid, and choline metabolism. It is characterized by multiple acyl-CoA dehydrogenase deficiencies resulting in large excretion not only of glutaric acid, but also of lactic, ethylmalonic, butyric, isobutyric, 2-methyl-butyric, and isovaleric acids.

A c.250G>A (p.Ala84Thr) mutation, the most common mutation in the ETFDH gene, causes increased production of reactive oxygen species (ROS) and shortened neurites in cells expressing this mutant compared to wild type cells. Suberic acid, an accumulated intermediate metabolite in dehydrogenase deficiency, can significantly impair neurite outgrowth in NSC34 cells. This shortening of neurites can be restored by riboflavin, carnitine, or Coenzyme Q10 supplements.

Interactions 
The encoded protein interacts with MYH7B, LINC00174, LINC00574, Homeobox protein goosecoid-2, AIRE, OTX1, Keratin-associated protein 13-2, Keratin-associated protein 11-1, TRIM69, Zinc finger protein 581, and COX6B1.

References

Further reading